Bifrenaria racemosa is a species of orchid.

racemosa